Ladislav Troják (15 June 1914 – 8 November 1948) was the first Slovak ice hockey player in the national team of Czechoslovakia and also the first Slovak hockey player with a title of World Champion (1947 World Championship). Troják wore the number 9.

He died on 8 November 1948 during an aircraft accident over the English Channel, along with five other members of the Czechoslovak national team.

Playing career
He was a player in the ice hockey teams of ČsŠK Košice (until 1934) and LTC Prague (1934–1948). He scored 37-times in 75 games for the national team of Czechoslovakia. Ladislav Troják is a member of the Slovak Hockey Hall of Fame since 30 November 2002, the Czech Hockey Hall of Fame since 2008 and the IIHF Hall of Fame since 2011.

The new home arena of the ice hockey team of HC Košice – The Steel Aréna – Košice's Ladislav Troják Stadium (open on 24 February 2006) is named in honour of Ladislav Troják. His daughter Jana Alexander-Trojak has lived in the United States since 1969. She lives in Prescott, Arizona and she is a fan of the NHL Arizona Coyotes.

External links
 Ladislav Troják in the Slovak Hockey Hall of Fame
 
 Steel Arena – Košice´s Ladislav Troják Stadium
 Official website of Hockey Club Košice

1914 births
1948 deaths
Slovak ice hockey right wingers
Czechoslovak ice hockey right wingers
Ice hockey players at the 1936 Winter Olympics
Ice hockey players at the 1948 Winter Olympics
Medalists at the 1948 Winter Olympics
Olympic ice hockey players of Czechoslovakia
Olympic medalists in ice hockey
Olympic silver medalists for Czechoslovakia
Sportspeople from Košice
Victims of aviation accidents or incidents in 1948
Victims of aviation accidents or incidents in international waters
IIHF Hall of Fame inductees